Nemapogon geniculatella is a moth of the family Tineidae. It is found in North America, where it has been recorded from California, Oregon, Montana, and Utah.

References

Moths described in 1905
Nemapogoninae